Dwayne Provo (born October 7, 1970) is a Canadian athlete, school administrator, and politician.

Early life
Provo was born in North Preston, Nova Scotia (one of Canada's largest Black communities) and attended university at Saint Mary's University where he played Canadian football and was drafted in 1995 by the Saskatchewan Roughriders.

Professional football career
He went on to play professional football in the Canadian Football League for 8 years (as well as a brief stint in the National Football League). Since retiring from football he has taken further university studies and worked as a school administrator.

Political career
In the 2006 Nova Scotia election, he ran as the Progressive Conservative candidate for the riding of Preston, but finished second to Liberal Keith Colwell. In 2009, he ran again but placed third behind Colwell and New Democrat Janet Sutcliffe.  He is a cousin to boxer Kirk Johnson and hockey player Evander Kane.

Electoral history

|-

|Liberal
|Keith Colwell
|align="right"|1,908
|align="right"|42.20
|align="right"|+0.07
|-

|New Democratic Party
|Janet Sutcliffe
|align="right"|1,316
|align="right"|29.11
|align="right"|+9.94
|-

|Progressive Conservative
|Dwayne Provo
|align="right"|1,240
|align="right"|27.43
|align="right"|-9.40
|-

|}

|-

|Liberal
|Keith Colwell
|align="right"|1,853
|align="right"|42.13
|align="right"|–
|-

|Progressive Conservative
|Dwayne Provo
|align="right"|1,610
|align="right"|36.83
|align="right"|–
|-

|New Democratic Party
|Douglas Sparks
|align="right"|843
|align="right"|19.17
|align="right"|–
|-

|}

References

External links 
 Canadian Football League stats at statscrew.com
 Biography at Dalhousie University

1970 births
Living people
Black Nova Scotians
Black Canadian players of Canadian football
Black Canadian politicians
Players of Canadian football from Nova Scotia
Progressive Conservative Association of Nova Scotia politicians
Candidates in Nova Scotia provincial elections
Canadian sportsperson-politicians
Saint Mary's Huskies football players
Montreal Alouettes players
Toronto Argonauts players
Edmonton Elks players
Saskatchewan Roughriders players
Ottawa Renegades players
BC Lions players
Canadian football defensive backs